The 9th Filipino Academy of Movie Arts and Sciences Awards Night was held in 1961 for the Outstanding Achievements for the year 1960. 

Huwag mo Akong Limutin of Premiere Productions, won the most awards with 8 wins including the most coveted FAMAS Award for Best Picture.  It was also the most nominated fil of the 1961 FAMAS Awards with 12 nominations.

Awards

Major Awards
Winners are listed first and highlighted with boldface.

Special Awardee

International Prestige Award of Merit - '
Bayanihan (LVN Pictures)
My Serenade (LVN Pictures)

References

External links
FAMAS Awards 

FAMAS Award
FAMAS
FAMAS